Pandora's Box is a Franco-Belgian comics series written by Alcante, illustrated by several artists and published by Dupuis in French and Cinebook in English.

Volumes
 L'Orgueil - Jan 2005   (illustrated by Didier Pagot)
 La Paresse - Jan 2005   (illustrated by Vujadin Radovanović)
 La Gourmandise - May 2005   (illustrated by Steven Dupré)
 La Luxure - May 2005   (illustrated by Roland Pignault)
 L'Avarice - Oct 2005    (illustrated by Erik Juszezak)
 L'Envie - Oct 2005   (illustrated by Alain Henriet)
 La Colère - Mar 2006    (illustrated by Damour)
 L'Espérance - Mar 2006    (illustrated by Didier Pagot)

Translations
Since March 2009, Cinebook Ltd has been publishing Pandora's Box. The following volumes have been released so far:

 Pride - March 2009  
 Sloth - Nov. 2009  
 Gluttony - Feb. 2010  
 Greed - August 2010  
 Envy - May 2011

References

Dupuis titles
Belgian comic strips
2004 comics debuts
Belgian graphic novels
Bandes dessinées
Drama comics